The Rock 'n' Roll Las Vegas Marathon & 1/2 Marathon is an annual marathon foot-race run on the Las Vegas Strip and in parts of the Las Vegas Valley, Nevada. The  race was one of the oldest marathons in the United States, having been run between 1967 - 2019.

History 
The initial concept was to attract nationally and internationally recognized runners; this was partially successful. Morris Aarbo of Canada won the first year with a time of 2:23:06, ahead of two marathoners from Turkey. A notable participant in the inaugural race was Harry Reid, who at the time was involved with local Nevada government. The subsequent 17 annual races fielded mostly local runners with a sprinkling of national- and international-caliber runners. When the Las Vegas Sun newspaper scuttled its sponsorship of the marathon in 1969, the recently formed Las Vegas Track Club took over the event. Over the ensuing years, enrollment in the race remained low—in the range of 100 to 200 entrants—until the running boom of 1978 when the numbers bumped up for a year or two. Subsequently, entrants again diminished, with fewer than 102 finishers in 1982.

In 1983 Al Boka assumed directorship and inaugurated what he expected to be a very fast course.  The new course bumped registration up to over 450 participants. However this downhill course proved to be too severe on the runners’ quadriceps, so after three years this route was discontinued.  The course was changed to have a smaller vertical drop in 1986.  Also beginning in 1986, prize money was offered to 19 age division winners. Later a half marathon was also added to the mix. Boka's strategy to attract more runners was successful; by 1992 enrollment exceeded 2000.

Boka remained race director of the Las Vegas Marathon for 23 years until he sold the event in 2005 to Devine Racing, a Chicago-based race organization company, which was also responsible for several other races, including the Los Angeles Marathon.  That year the marathon date was changed from January to December after securing Las Vegas Events endorsement along with approval of the Las Vegas Convention and Visitors Authority. Both organizations were motivated by attracting visitors during the "slower" December time period and their  consent was necessary for holding any large downtown event.  The course was also changed to take place partially in the city.

The Rock 'n' Roll Era 

In 2009 the race was acquired by the Competitor Group, Inc. and incorporated into its Rock 'n' Roll Marathon Series and the course was changed for a fourth time since 1982.

Since the Competitor Group acquired the race in 2009, the number of full distance marathoners has diminished, while the overall participation has increased dramatically . The venue itself, held at night on the Strip, has become more of a pop culture phenomenon than an international marathon.

Runners in the 2011 event reported illness, overcrowding, and at least one person was hospitalized.

In 2014 the overall entrants exceeded 38,000 participants with only 3,208 runners completing the full 26.2 miles. 25,251 runners finished the half-marathon, 2,194 runners completed the 6.555-mile course while the balance ran a 5 kilometer (3.1 mile) race the day before the main event. Many of the short-distance runners were costumed. The Monte Carlo Casino promoted a ‘run-thru wedding’ during the race. While a high volume of entrants is necessary to carry the cost of closing the Las Vegas Strip for more than 12 hours, the paucity of actual marathoners distinguish the Las Vegas event from other big city venues such as Boston, New York, Chicago, London, or Berlin where the number of marathon finishers range from about 20,000 to more than 30,000. While successful as a commercial, for profit venture, this race falls short of the original vision to make the Las Vegas Marathon a world class, competitive running event.

In 2017, the race was acquired by and is now organized by the IRONMAN Group, part of Wanda Sports Holdings.

Organizers decided not to hold the 2020 edition of the race on its original date in November due to the coronavirus pandemic. Entrants were given either refunds or automatic entry deferral to 2021.

Course 

From 1967 to 2004 the marathon course was located on several different routes within Clark County, but outside of downtown Las Vegas.

In 1983, Al Boka inaugurated a course that started on State Route 160, high in the Spring Mountains west of Las Vegas on the road to Pahrump, and descended approximately 2,900 feet (883.9m) into the valley, finishing at the Renaissance Center located at the corner of East Tropicana and Eastern Avenues.

The 1986 marathon course was changed to a smaller, 700-foot (213.36m) vertical drop. The new route headed north on State Route 604 from Jean NV, paralleling Interstate 15 much of the way, to its finish point at Sunset Park.

In 2005, the race course was moved from suburban Clark County to the Las Vegas "Strip" and partially in the city of Las Vegas.  The loop course between 2005 and 2008 began and finished at Mandalay Bay Resort and Casino. After heading north on Las Vegas Boulevard (The Strip), to the Fremont Street Experience and the Downtown area, the course meandered further northwest of the city and ultimately looped back to the west before reaching Mandalay Bay's parking lot at the finish. The Half Marathon Course remained along the Strip.

In its most recent iteration, the full marathon began on Las Vegas Boulevard heading north through the Downtown casino area, proceeded further to the northwest, turns around and finished again on the strip near the Mirage and Venetian Casinos.

The event was not held in 2020 or 2021 because of the COVID-19 pandemic. It was announced in February, 2021 that Competitor group would be next hold their Las Vegas events on February 26 and 27, 2022. The decision was made to move the event due to the increasing difficulty of scheduling closures of the Las Vegas Boulevard that didn't conflict with sporting events involving the Vegas Golden Knights at T-Mobile Arena or the Las Vegas Raiders at Allegiant Stadium.

Furthermore, Competitor announced that the Rock 'n Roll Las Vegas event would no longer offer the full marathon distance, due to poor feedback on the event from prior participants. Competitor will instead offer the half-marathon distance, 10 km and 5 km races.

Winners 

Key: Course record (in bold)

1967 — Morris Aarbo: 2:23:06 Las Vegas Sun Marathon (first course)

Notes

References

List of winners
Leydig, Jack & Milroy, Andy (2011-12-05). Las Vegas Marathon. Association of Road Racing Statisticians. Retrieved on 2011-12-07.

External links

Recurring sporting events established in 1967
Marathons in the United States
Sports competitions in Las Vegas
Dalian Wanda Group